The Reluctant Dragon & Mr. Toad Show is a 1970 American animated television series that aired on ABC's Saturday morning schedule. The show features two characters created by British children's writer Kenneth Grahame: the Reluctant Dragon from the 1898 short story of the same name, and Mr. Toad from the 1908 novel The Wind in the Willows. The show was created by Rankin/Bass Productions in New York City, who produced 17 episodes. The show was a flop and canceled midway through its first season, airing from September 12 until December 26, 1970. A year later, ABC aired reruns of the show on Sunday mornings on September 12, 1971.

The half-hour comedy program included three shorts on each episode: the Reluctant Dragon took the first and third slots, with a Mr. Toad cartoon in the middle. Written by Romeo Muller and William J. Keenan, the series uses a team of Canadian voice actors with Bernard Cowan as the recording supervisor. Tobias, the Reluctant Dragon, was voiced by Paul Soles; other characters were performed by Donna Miller, Claude Rae and Carl Banas. The series' character designs were done by Paul Coker, Jr., and the animation supervision by Steve Nakagawa at Mushi Production in Tokyo.

The Reluctant Dragon
Tobias is a gentle, dreamy dragon who was cursed by the wizard Merlin with flaming breath, which comes upon him every time that he sneezes. He is a kind-hearted soul who doesn't want to hurt the populace of Willowmarch Village, and is ashamed whenever he erupts in flame. He's regularly troubled by a little blonde girl who wants to give him a bouquet of daisies, which make him sneeze. Tobias is aided by a knight, Sir Malcolm Giles, who tries to protect both the village and the dragon. Willowmarch is ruled by King Herman, who hosts a variety show. Other characters include Sir Andrew, Irving the Bold and Ugliola.

Titles of the Reluctant Dragon cartoons included "National Daisy Week", "The Campscout Girls', "A Cold Day in Wilowmarch", "The Tobias Touch" and "Tobias, the Reluctant Viking".

Mr. Toad
Mr. Toad is a gadabout playboy who likes driving fast cars and wearing expensive clothes. He's the wealthy owner of Toad Hall, and an object of ridicule among his friends — the timid Mole, intellectual Badger and outgoing Water Rat. Unlike Tobias, who lives in medieval Willowmarch, Mr. Toad live in 19th Century England, but in the episode "Toad's Time Machine", Mr. Toad and friends travel back in time to medieval Willowmarch, and wind up meeting Tobias, Daisy, and King Herman. 

Some of Mr. Toad's stories included "Ghost of Toad Hall", "Micemaster Road", "Build a Better Bungalow", "Polo Panic" and "Jove! What a Day".

In 1986, Rankin/Bass produced a more faithful TV-movie adaptation of The Wind in the Willows.

Episode list
 A Cold Day in Willowmarch / Build a Better Bungalow / A Day at the Fair
 Cowardly Herman / Casey Toad / Daisies Away
 Dippy / Gentlemen's Gentleman / Dragon Under Glass
 Free a Cold, Starve a Viking / Ghost of Toad Hall / Happy Birthday, Dear Tobias
 How to Be a Wizard / Jack of All Trades / How to Vex a Viking
 If It's a Wednesday It Must Be Vikingland / Jove! What a Day / Lights, Camera, Action
 Merlin the Magician, Jr. / Micemaster Road / National Daisy Week
 Never Count on a Cornflower / Movie Maker Toad / No Bix Like Show Bix
 Saving the Crown / Polo Panic / Sir Tobias
 Subway Sabotage / Sail Ho-Ho / Taxes Are a Drag on Dragons
 The Big Break / Sandhogs / The Campscout Girls
 The Flying Flagon / The Amphibious Mr. Toad / The Haunted Castle
 The Kid's Last Fight / The Demolition Derby / The Purple Viking
 The Robot Dragon / The Great Bonfire Contest / The Starve Versus Herman, the Attrocious
 The Tobias Touch / The Great Motorcycle Race / Tobias the Terror of the Tournament
 Tobias, the Reluctant Viking / Toad's Time Machine / Wretched Robin Hood
 The Toughest Daisy in Willowmarch / Twenty Thousand Inches Under the Sea / The Great Zoo Breakout

Voices
Paul Soles - Tobias, Irving The Bold, Merlin The Magician Jr., Additional voices

Carl Banas - King Herman The Atrocious, Ugliola, Additional voices

Donna Miller - Daisy, Additional voices

Claude Rae - Mr. Toad, Sir Malcolm Giles, Badger, Mole, Water Rat, Additional voices

References

Rankin/Bass Productions television series
American Broadcasting Company original programming
1970s American animated television series
American children's animated comedy television series
English-language television shows
Animated television series about dragons
Animated television series about frogs
Television shows based on The Wind in the Willows
Television series by Universal Television